The Palatov D1 is an American lightweight race car that was designed  Dennis Palatov manufactured by his Portland, Oregon-based company Palatov Motorsport.  A proof-of-concept prototype (dp1) was constructed over a period of several years using a 4-cylinder engine from Suzuki Hayabusa motorcycle.  There are detailed blogs on the design, build and testing of the prototype.  After extensive testing the prototype was eventually retired and has since found a second life as the electric racecar.

Dennis Palatov created the Palatov D1, a lightweight American race car that is produced by Palatov Motorsport, a business he founded in Portland, Oregon. Over the course of several years, a proof-of-concept prototype (dp1) was built using a 4-cylinder engine from a Suzuki Hayabusa motorcycle.

Taking everything learned from the dp1 prototype, Dennis formed Palatov Motorsport in 2008 to manufacture lightweight track and racing cars.  The first car released was the D4.  Its development is documented in a separate blog.  The D1 development continued with improved bodywork for aerodynamics and downforce and for the powertrain utilizing the American small displacement, compact and lightweight, high revving, double overhead cam 430 hp Hartley V8 engine available either naturally aspirated or with forced-induction.  First production D1 is expected to be released in 2011 and the development is being documented in its own bolg.

With a proprietary AWD system, extreme light weight and 1,000 hp per metric ton the D1 will be the flagship of the Palatov Motorsport product lineup. The D1 is designed to utilize the American designed and built Hartley V8 exclusively.

The production V8 version is intended for skilled and experienced track drivers who can make use of its potential. The D1 will only be sold as a complete (turnkey) car exclusively for track use with no streetable option.

Specifications
Preliminary specifications

Engine: Custom 3,000cc naturally aspirated DOHC V8, 430 hp @10,000 RPM, 220 lb-ft @6500 RPM
Transmission: Hewland 5-speed sequential with reverse
Weight: Approximately 950 lb (431 kg)
Power/weight: 1,000 hp/metric ton (2.2 lb/hp)
Wheelbase: 80.5"
Length: 113"
Width: 68"
Height: 39" (top of rollbar)
Ground Clearance: 1.5"
Drivetrain: proprietary AWD system with chain drive and limited slip differentials
Chassis: advanced composite, quick-change bodywork
Wheels: 13x8 Tires: 20x8-13 race slicks
Price: US$150,000

References

Sources
 Article about the future power plant of the dp1
 Gadgetopia article summarizing the dp1

External links
 development and test blogs for Palatov cars.
 the D1 is a product of Palatov Motorsport.

Sports cars